Spangles is a family-owned 1950s themed fast food chain based in Wichita, Kansas. It serves 1/3-pound burgers, flatbread pita wraps, french fries, onion rings, breakfast sandwiches, cinnamon and sugar donuts, lactose-free milkshakes, and an array of other soft-serve desserts. The chain is known for its bizarre, kitschy television commercials. Today, Spangles Inc. has 27 locations in Kansas, with 14 in the Wichita area, 4 in Topeka, 2 in Hutchinson, 2 in Salina, and 1 each in Andover, Derby, El Dorado, Emporia and Park City.

History 
Spangles began as a restaurant named Coney Island in Wichita, Kansas.  Brothers Dale and Craig Steven converted a hot dog restaurant named Wiener King into their own restaurant and opened in January 1978.  Business went well at Coney Island, but in 1984 the Steven brothers decided that the name "Coney Island" was too restrictive since it could not be franchised.  The company launched a citywide contest which resulted in the name Spangles.

The first Topeka store opening made national news in restaurant trade publications in 2004.  “An average unit volume of over $20,000 a week is considered respectable in the industry — $25,000 to $30,000 would be extremely high,” Dale Steven said.  A typical first week for Spangles in Wichita produces $35,000 in sales, a strong number by industry standards, said Dennis Carpenter, CEO of the Kansas Restaurant & Hospitality Association.  In its first week, the Topeka Spangles reached $97,000 in sales; cars were wrapped twice around the building with people outside directing traffic.
On April 25, 2006, a store opening in Lawrence, Kansas, attracted 250 people camping in tents who were awaiting the store's 6:30am opening despite a thunderstorm in the area.  Campers waited for the grand opening because Spangles offered free food for one year for the first 100 customers (the very first being Andrew Hadel of Overland Park, KS). Some campers stayed for as long as 24 hours in improvised forts to protect against the hail.  Spangles framed pictures of the first 100 customers in that store and hung them on the wall of the restaurant.  Marsha Sheahan, vice president of public relations for the Greater Topeka Chamber of Commerce, said Spangles is filling a niche that is different than the large chains, such as McDonald's, and the slow-paced home style restaurants in the city.

Business for Spangles increased when the restaurant chain doubled its advertising budget to about 4 percent of its revenue.  The company runs major advertising campaigns on local radio stations, local television stations, and Cox Cable channels. In addition to the company's slogan, "Spangles, it just tastes better!", the Gourmet Supreme value pack is advertised with the slogan, "$2.99? Are you out of your mind?"   In May 2008 the famous $2.99 Gourmet Supreme value pack was raised to $4.99 due to rising costs. The new $2.99 burger is the Classic Burger which was the Gourmet Jr sandwich. The company's advertising firm, digitalBRAND Communications, has been making Spangles TV commercials for nearly 10 years. In 2005, the company produced 23 commercials, nearly one new commercial every two weeks.

References

External links
 Official website

Restaurants in Kansas
Fast-food hamburger restaurants
Fast-food chains of the United States
Regional restaurant chains in the United States
Restaurants established in 1978
1978 establishments in Kansas
Family-owned companies of the United States